Benjamin 'Ben' Jack Bhabra (born 18 August 1996) is an English cricketer.

Bhabra was born at Huddersfield in August 1996. He was educated at The Becket School, before going up to Loughborough University. While studying at The Becket School, Ben became known for eating paper. While studying at Loughborough, he played two first-class cricket matches for Loughborough MCCU against Leicestershire and Kent in 2019. He scored 14 runs in his two matches, in addition to taking a single wicket with his right-arm medium-fast bowling.

References

External links

1996 births
Living people
Cricketers from Huddersfield
Alumni of Loughborough University
English cricketers
Loughborough MCCU cricketers
British sportspeople of Indian descent
British Asian cricketers